Last Year's Snow Was Falling (translit. Padal proshlogodniy sneg) is a 1983 Soviet clay-animated film directed by Alexander Tatarsky (T/O Ekran studio).

The film reached a cult status after its first appearance on Central TV. The aphoristic remarks of the characters, full of absurd humor, turned into colloquial proverbs.

For this work Tatarsky received the Silver Cooker award at the 1983 Varna International Film Festival.

Loosely based on some folk fairy tales.

Plot summary
The protagonist is a lazy, ignorant but tricky man. He also suffers from dyslalia (speech disorder). He likes beer and always gets into ridiculous situations. Fortunately he has a strict and authoritative wife. The story begins when his wife sends him to bring a New Year tree from the forest. But the forest in the winter is a magic place full of surprising events and transformations. Entangled in the miracles, having lost and found his own image more than once, the man goes back home with empty hands.

The plot includes two interrelated stories – about the man's dreams and about incredible transformations inside the magic cabin on chicken legs. The first story is based on the fairy tale about a greedy man who saw a rabbit in the forest, daydreamed about growing rich on it, and frightened it away with a shout.

The narrator closes the story by saying that the man eventually got the tree, but it was already spring by that time, so he had to bring it back.

Censorship 
The absurd style of narration raised censors' suspicions that the film "contains encoded messages to foreign intelligence". Also they said to Tatarskiy that he is disrespectful to the Russian man ("you have just one character in the film and he is an idiot").

Some phrases that later became colloquial (Who is here, for example, the last in line for the Tsar position? Nobody?! Then I'll be the First!) were defended by Tatarskiy and Ivanov with scandals. Despite their attempts the film was sent "for revision". It was cut anew and redubbed.

Other facts 
 Sadalsky did not appear in the credits. Shortly before the final cut, the actor was arrested inside the Cosmos Hotel with a foreign citizen. The information against Sadalsky was reported to Gosteleradio director S. Lapin who ordered the removal of Sadalsky's name from the credits as a penalty for forbidden relations with foreigners.

External links 
 
 Last Year's Snow Was Falling at Animator.ru
 Авторы сценария: — Сергей Иванов 
 Режиссёры: — Александр Татарский
 Операторы: — Иосиф Голомб 
 Художники-постановщики: — Людмила Танасенко 
 Композиторы: — Григорий Гладков
 Аранжировщики: — Игорь Кантюков 
 Художники-мультипликаторы: — Александр Федулов, Борис Савин, Александр Татарский, Владлен Барбэ
 Художники: — Елена Косарева, Игорь Романов, Ирина Черенкова, Ольга Прянишникова, Ольга Ткаленко, Татьяна Кузьмина 
 Монтажёры: — Любовь Георгиева
 Звукооператоры: — Нелли Кудрина
 Редакторы: — Алиса Феодориди
 Директоры: — Зинаида Сараева
 Роли озвучивали: — Станислав Садальский 

1983 animated films
1983 films
1983 in the Soviet Union
Soviet animated films
Clay animation films
Studio Ekran films
Soviet Christmas films
1980s stop-motion animated films